Connoire Bay is natural bay or cove on the island of Newfoundland in the province of Newfoundland and Labrador, Canada. Miffel Island is nearby.

References

Bays of Newfoundland and Labrador